Luis Fernández de la Vega (1601 – 1675 in Gijón) was a Spanish sculptor and carver. He was born in Asturias, but began working in Valladolid. Once he returned to Asturias he never left.

Works
Gijón is the altarpiece of Contrueces sanctuary, in Gijón
altarpieces of the chapels of Santa Barbara and Vigiles, 
the altar of St. Martin
the statue the Vigil de Quiñones and 
images of San Roque, 
the Conception and St. Teresa of Jesus

People from Gijón
1601 births
1675 deaths
17th-century Spanish sculptors
Spanish male sculptors